Maria Ager (unknown – unknown) was an Austrian chess player, Austrian Women's Chess Championship medalist (1966, 1968).

Biography
In the 1960s Maria Ager was one of the leading Austrian women's chess players. In Austrian Women's Chess Championship she won two medals: silver (1966) and bronze (1968).

Maria Ager played for Austria in the Women's Chess Olympiads:
 In 1966, at second board in the 3rd Chess Olympiad (women) in Oberhausen (+1, =1, -7),
 In 1969, at second board in the 4th Chess Olympiad (women) in Lublin (+2, =1, -11).

References

External links

Maria Ager chess games at 365Chess.com

Year of birth missing
Year of death missing
Austrian female chess players
Chess Olympiad competitors
20th-century chess players